Reith bei Kitzbühel is a municipality in the Kitzbühel district in the Austrian state of Tyrol located 4.50 km northwest of Kitzbühel. Main source of income is tourism.

Population

Panorama

References

External links
Reith Gigapixel Panorama (8.470 Megapixel)

Kitzbühel Alps
Cities and towns in Kitzbühel District